10 år – En snäll mans bekännelser is a 2008 Patrik Isaksson compilation album.

Track listing
"Du får göra som du vill"
"Ruta 1"
"Under mitt tunna skinn"
"Kom genom eld" - single remix
"Elddon"
"Hjärtat vet mer än vi" - with Helen Sjöholm
"Innan klockan slår" - 'with Dea"1985"
"Det som var nu" - with Marie Fredriksson'' 
"Aldrig mer"
"Hos dig är jag underbar"
"Faller du så faller jag"
"Du som tog mitt hjärta" - 'with Sarah Dawn Finer"Här kommer natten" - ''''with Joey Tempest
"Vår sista dag"
"Kan du se mig"
"Innan dagen gryr (2008)"
"Koppången" - ''''with Kalle Moraeus & Bengan Janson

Charts

References

External links

2008 compilation albums
Compilation albums by Swedish artists
Patrik Isaksson (singer) albums
Swedish-language compilation albums